Pluteus villosus is a medicinal mushroom in the Pluteaceae family.

Chemistry
The mushroom contains psilocybin.

See also
List of Psilocybin mushrooms

References

villosus
Psychoactive fungi
Psychedelic tryptamine carriers